Pauline Barrieu is a French financial statistician, probability theorist, and expert on financial risk assessment, risk transfer, and uncertainty quantification. She is a professor of statistics in the London School of Economics.

Education and career

She has been a member of the statistics department at the London School of Economics since 2002, becoming a professor in 2012 and serving as head of the department for 2016–2019.

Recognition
In 2003, Barrieu was one of the winners of the Prix de l'Actuariat, an annual international award for top doctoral dissertations in actuarial science.

She was the 2018 winner of the Louis Bachelier Prize. The award cited her work on "how we address model risk, uncertainty, and risk sharing under uncertainty".

References

External links
Home page

Year of birth missing (living people)
Living people
French economists
French statisticians
Women economists
Women statisticians
Academics of the London School of Economics